The 1957 Brisbane Rugby League season was the 49th season of the Brisbane Rugby League premiership. Seven teams from across Brisbane competed for the premiership, which culminated in Fortitude Valley defeating Past Brothers 18-17 in the grand final.

Ladder

Finals 

Source:

References 

1957 in rugby league
1957 in Australian rugby league
Rugby league in Brisbane